Vikram Sahay is a Canadian actor best known for playing Kevin Calvin on Radio Active, Lester Patel on the NBC television series Chuck, and Rama in the Roxy Hunter saga.

Life and career
Vik Sahay was born in Ottawa, Ontario, to Indian parents, and attended Canterbury High School of the Arts in Ottawa. He went on to study Theatre Performance at Montreal's Concordia University.

He learned to perform Indian classical dance with his brother Sidharth Sahay. In 1986 and 1987, he appeared on three episodes of the children's television show You Can't Do That on Television. He was also featured in the television series Radio Active, playing sportscaster Kevin Calvin. Based on that work, he was selected to appear in Our Hero as Dalal Vidya, for which he was nominated for a 2002 Canadian Comedy Award. Subsequently, he also portrayed attorney Anil Sharma on the CBC series This is Wonderland during its second and third seasons.

Sahay has appeared in such films as Roxy Hunter and the Mystery of the Moody Ghost, Good Will Hunting, eXistenZ, Hollow Point, Rainbow, The Ride, Wings of Hope, The Rocker, Amal, and Afghan Luke. He portrayed Lester Patel, the "HinJew" half of Jeffster!, on the television series Chuck. He played the role of Prateek Duraiswamy (Stifler's boss) in the film American Reunion. He was a guest star as a murder suspect on the FOX show Bones season 8 episode 13. In 2016 he had a guest starring role on the revival of The X-Files.

Personal life
Sahay divides his time between Los Angeles and Toronto.

Filmography

Video Games

References

External links

 Vik Sahay Fansite
 
 
 
Interview at WickedInfo.com

Living people
Canadian male television actors
Canadian male film actors
Canadian male voice actors
Canadian people of Indian descent
Male actors from Ottawa
Male actors from Quebec
Canadian male actors of Indian descent
Year of birth missing (living people)